Walter William Skeat,  (21 November 18356 October 1912) was a British philologist and Anglican deacon. The pre-eminent British philologist of his time, he was instrumental in developing the English language as a higher education subject in the United Kingdom.

Life
Skeat was born in London to architect William Skeat, of Perry Hill, Sydenham, later of Mount Street, Park Lane, City of Westminster, and his wife Sarah, daughter of Timothy Bluck. The Skeat family were a branch of an ancient Surrey family, and were resident in the parish of St George Hanover Square since the 1700s. He was educated at King's College School (Wimbledon), Highgate School, and Christ's College, Cambridge.  He became a fellow at Christ's College in July 1860.

In 1860, Skeat was ordained an Anglican deacon and married Bertha Clara. In December 1860, he became a curate at East Dereham, where he served during 1861 and most of 1862. From 1862 to 1863, Skeat served as the curate at Godalming, Surrey. In October 1864, he returned to Cambridge University as a mathematics lecturer, a position he held until 1871.

Skeat soon developed an interest in the history of the English language.  In 1870, Skeat and Henry Bradshaw collaborated on an edition on Geoffrey Chaucer for the University of Oxford. However, the project fell through when Bradshaw failed to keep his commitment. In 1894, Skeat published a six-volume edition on Chaucer; a supplementary volume, Chaucerian Pieces, was published in 1897.

In 1878, Skeat was elected the Elrington and Bosworth Professor of Anglo-Saxon at Cambridge. He completed Mitchell Kemble's edition of the Anglo-Saxon Gospels, and did work both in Old English and the Gothic language.  Skeat is best known for his work in Middle English, and for his standard editions of Chaucer and William Langland's Piers Plowman.

Skeat was the founder and only president of the English Dialect Society from 1873 to 1896. The society's purpose was to collect materials for the publication of The English Dialect Dictionary.  The society was dissolved in 1897.

Skeat is buried at the Ascension Parish Burial Ground in Cambridge.

Skeat's wife, Bertha Clara, born 6 February 1840, died 15 July 1924, is buried with him, as is a daughter Bertha Marian Skeat who was a writer and headmistress. His son was the anthropologist Walter William Skeat. His grandsons include the noted palaeographer T. C. Skeat and the stained glass painter Francis Skeat.

Work

Etymology, lexicography, and place-name studies

In pure philology, Skeat's principal achievement was his An Etymological Dictionary of the English Language (4 parts, 1879–1882; rev., and enlarged, 1910). While preparing the dictionary, he wrote hundreds of short articles on word origins for the London-based journal Notes and Queries.

Skeat also coined the term ghost word and was a leading expert in this subject. Skeat was also a pioneer of place-name studies. His major publications in this field include:
A Concise Dictionary of Middle English (1888), in conjunction with A. L. Mayhew
"A Glossary of Tudor and Stuart Words" (1914) with A. L. Mayhew
The place-names of Cambridgeshire (1901)
Place-names of Huntingdonshire (1902)
Place-names of Hertfordshire (1904)
Place-names of Bedfordshire (1906)
Place-names of Berkshire (1911)
Place-names of Suffolk (1913)

Editions

The Holy Gospels in Anglo-Saxon, Northumbrian, and Old Mercian Versions (1871)
 Chaucer's A Treatise on the Astrolabe (1872) 
 Piers Plowman in three parallel texts (1886) 
 The Complete Works of Geoffrey Chaucer (1894–97)

Skeat edited works for the Early English Text Society:
Bruce of John Barbour 
Pierce the Ploughman's Crede 
Havelok the Dane
William of Palerne

For the Scottish Text Society:
Skeat edited The Kingis Quair, 
Skeat published an edition (2 vols., 1871) of Chatterton, with an investigation of the sources of the obsolete words used by Chatterton. 
Skeat published an edition of Chaucer in one volume for general readers
Skeat published an edition of Chaucer's A Treatise on the Astrolabe, with an expert commentary.

Skeat produced what is still the main edition of Ælfric of Eynsham's Lives of the Saints; the edition includes translations which were largely the work of two women referred to as Mss Gunning and Wilkinson, who were credited in the preface to his edition.

Teaching

According to A. J. Wyatt, Skeat "was not a great teacher ... he left the teaching to those who had learned from him" – i.e. Wyatt himself and Israel Gollancz – "his teaching was episodic. Yet his lectures were eagerly followed by the fit though few; they were always interesting when least utilitarian, when he forgot examinations and syllabuses, and poured forth from the quaint storehouse of his motley memory things new and old."

Skeat's pedagogical works include:

Specimens of English from 1394 to 1597 (1871)
Specimens of Early English from 1298 to 1393 (1872), in conjunction with Richard Morris
Principles of English Etymology (2 series, 1887 and 1891)
A Student's Pastime (1896), a volume of essays
The Chaucer Canon (1900)
A Primer of Classical and English Philology (1905)

International relations
Skeat was one of the very few scholars in English studies who had sufficient expertise to compete with the state-employed and tenured colleagues from German universities.

Like Henry Sweet, Skeat regarded Geoffrey Chaucer and other medieval English authors as part of his national heritage and objected to German scholars publishing works on them. At one point, Skeat exclaimed that even though he was "...to some extent disqualified, as being merely a native of London, in which city Chaucer himself was born," he should be able to contribute scholarship on Chaucer without perceived German interference.

Notes

References

External links

 
 
 
 A Moeso-Gothic glossary Cornell University Library Historical Monographs Collection.
 
 

1835 births
1912 deaths
People educated at King's College School, London
People from Sydenham, London
English philologists
Etymologists
Alumni of Christ's College, Cambridge
Fellows of Christ's College, Cambridge
People educated at Highgate School
Elrington and Bosworth Professors of Anglo-Saxon
Chaucer scholars
Fellows of the British Academy
Toponymists
Anglican clergy from London